Kujuvar,, also known as Kojabad (also Romanized as Kojābād; Kojāābād, Gujavār, Kajābād, Kajvān, Kojavār, Kojovār, and Kyudzhuvar) is a  district in the western part of Tabriz, East Azerbaijan Province, Iran. At the 2016 census, its population was 6,001, in 1,881 families.

References 

Populated places in Tabriz County